Stepan Andriyovych Bandera (nickname Baba aka Stefan Popel; 1 January 1909 – 15 October 1959) was a Ukrainian far-right leader of the radical, militant wing of the Organization of Ukrainian Nationalists, the OUN-B.

Bandera was born in the Austro-Hungarian Empire, in Galicia, into the family of a priest of the Ukrainian Greek Catholic Church. Involved in nationalist organizations from a young age, Bandera was sentenced to death for his involvement in the 1934 assassination of Poland's Minister of the Interior Bronisław Pieracki, commuted to life imprisonment.

Bandera was freed from prison in 1939 following the invasion of Poland, and moved to Krakow. He prepared the 30 June 1941 Proclamation of Ukrainian statehood, pledging to work with Nazi Germany after Germany invaded the Soviet Union on 22 June 1941. The Germans disapproved of the proclamation. For his refusal to rescind the decree, Bandera was arrested by the Gestapo. After the war, Bandera settled with his family in West Germany. In 1959, fourteen years after the end of the war, Bandera was assassinated by KGB agents in Munich, West Germany. 

Bandera remains a highly controversial figure in Ukraine. Many Ukrainians hail him as a role model hero or as a  martyred liberation fighter, while other Ukrainians, particularly in the south and east, condemn him as a fascist Nazi collaborator who was, together with his followers, responsible for massacres of Polish and Jewish civilians during the Second World War.

On 22 January 2010, the President of Ukraine, Viktor Yushchenko, awarded Bandera the posthumous title of Hero of Ukraine, which was widely condemned, leading to the annulment of the award.

Early life

Stepan Bandera was born on 1 January 1909 in Staryi Uhryniv, Galicia, Austria-Hungary (officially the Kingdom of Galicia and Lodomeria, created after the first partition of Poland, now in Western Ukraine) to Ukrainian Greek Catholic Church priest Andriy Bandera (1882–1941) and Myroslava (1890–1921) into a family that would number eight in total. Bandera's younger brothers included Oleksandr, who would go on to earn a doctorate in political economy at the University of Rome, and Vasyl who finished a degree in philosophy at the University of Lviv.

Bandera grew up in a patriotic and religious household. He did not attend primary school due to the First World War and was taught at home by his parents. Young Stepan Bandera was undersized and slim. He sang in a choir, played guitar and mandolin, enjoyed hiking, jogging, swimming, ice skating, basketball and chess.

After the dissolution of Austria-Hungary in the wake of World War I, Galicia briefly became the West Ukrainian People's Republic. Bandera's father, who joined the Ukrainian Galician Army as a chaplain, was active in the nationalist movement preceding the Polish–Ukrainian War, which was fought between November 1918 to July 1919 and ended with Ukrainian defeat and the reintegration of the West Ukrainian People's Republic into eastern Poland. His mother moved with her sons to the town of Yahilnytsya in Chortkiv Raion while her husband Andriy was away. The Chortkiv offensive in June 1919 initially saw the Ukrainian Galician Army successfully capture land in the area, but they were outnumbered about five to one and were pushed over the river Zbruch. With Poles arriving to reclaim the area and her husband away, Myroslava and her sons began the almost 100-mile voyage back west to Staryi Uhryniv. She became ill on the way and never fully recovered. She died from tuberculosis at the age of 31.

Mykola Mikhnovsky's 1900 publication, Independent Ukraine, influenced the young Bandera greatly. After graduating from a Ukrainian high school in 1927, where he was engaged in a number of youth organizations, Bandera planned to attend the Husbandry Academy in Czechoslovakia, but he either did not get a passport or the Academy notified him that it was closed. In 1928, Bandera enrolled in the agronomy program at the Politechnika Lwowska in Lwów, but never completed his studies due to his political activities and arrests.

Pre-World War II activity

Early activities

Stepan Bandera had met and associated himself with members of a variety of Ukrainian nationalist organizations throughout his schooling, from Plast, to the Union for the Liberation of Ukraine and the Organization of Ukrainian Nationalists.

In the early 1930s, in response to attacks perpetrated by Ukrainian nationalists, Polish authorities carried out the pacification of Ukrainians in Eastern Galicia against the Ukrainian minority. This resulted in destroyed property and mass detentions, and took place in southeastern voivodeships of the Second Polish Republic.

At the same time, Bandera was actively recruiting groups of Ukrainian nationalists and was arrested six times for unlawful crossings of the Polish-Czechoslovak frontier while smuggling prohibited OUN periodicals into Poland.

OUN

Bandera joined OUN in 1929, and quickly climbed through the ranks, becoming the chief propaganda officer in 1931, the second in command of OUN in Galicia in 1932–1933, and the head of the OUN national executive in Galicia in June 1933.

In 1931, Polish politician Tadeusz Hołówko was assassinated by two members of the OUN. Although there is no direct implication of Bandera's involvement in his assassination, Bandera is known to have expanded the OUN's network in the borderlands between Poland and today’s Ukraine, known as Kresy, directing it against both Poland and the Soviet Union. An internal CIA report from 1946 stated that from 1932 Bandera was assistant chief of OUN and around that time controlled several "warrior units" in Poland in places such as the Free City of Danzig (Wolne Miasto Gdańsk), Drohobycz, Lwów, Stanisławów, Brzezany, and Truskawiec. Bandera collaboratorated closely with Richard Yary, who would later side with Bandera and help him form OUN-B.

To stop expropriations, Bandera turned OUN against the Polish officials who were directly responsible for anti-Ukrainian policies. Activities ranged from terrorist acts, such as attacks on post-offices, bomb-throwing at Polish exhibitions and murders of policemen to mass campaigns against Polish tobacco and alcohol monopolies and against the denationalization of Ukrainian youth. In 1934 Bandera was arrested in Lwów and tried twice: first, concerning involvement in a plot to assassinate the minister of internal affairs, Bronisław Pieracki, and second at a general trial of OUN executives. He was convicted of terrorism and sentenced to death. The death sentence was commuted to life imprisonment.

After the trials, Bandera became renowned and admired among Ukrainians in Poland  as a symbol of a revolutionary who fought for Ukrainian independence. While in prison Bandera was not completely isolated from the world political discourse of the late 1930s thanks to Ukrainian and other newspaper subscriptions delivered to his cell.

Bandera was freed from Brest (Brześć) Prison in Eastern Poland in early September 1939, as a result of the invasion of Poland. There are differing accounts of the circumstances of his release. Soon thereafter Eastern Poland was occupied by the Soviet Union. There, he also came in contact with the leader of the OUN, Andriy Atanasovych Melnyk. In 1940, the political differences and expectations between the two leaders caused the OUN to split into two factions, OUN-B and OUN-M (Banderites and Melnykites) each one claiming legitimacy.

The OUN-M faction led by Melnyk preached a more conservative approach to nation-building, while the OUN-B faction, led by Bandera, supported a revolutionary approach, however in terms of radical nationalism, fascism, anti-semitism, xenophobia and violence both factions didn’t contradict each other. The vast majority of young OUN members joined Bandera's faction, which was devoted to the independence of Ukraine, a single-party fascist totalitarian state free of national minorities and was later responsible for the ethnic cleansing, pogroms, implicated in collaboration with Nazi Germany and the Holocaust.

Formation of Mobile Groups
Before the independence proclamation of 30 June 1941, Bandera oversaw the formation of so-called "Mobile Groups" which were small (5–15 members) groups of OUN-B members who would travel from General Government to Western Ukraine and, after a German advance to Eastern Ukraine, encourage support for the OUN-B and establish local authorities run by OUN-B activists.

In total, approximately 7,000 people participated in these mobile groups, and they found followers among a wide circle of intellectuals, such as Ivan Bahriany, Vasyl Barka, Hryhorii Vashchenko and many others.

Formation of the UPA

World War II

Before World War II territory of today’s Ukraine was split between Poland, the Soviet Union, Romania and Czechoslovakia. Prior to 1939 invasion of Poland, German military intelligence recruited OUN members into Bergbauernhilfe unit, also smuggled Ukrainian nationalists into Poland in order to erode Polish defences by conducting a terror campaign directed at Polish farmers and Jews. OUN leaders Andriy Melnyk (code name Consul I) and Bandera (code name Consul II) both served as agents of the Nazi Germany military intelligence Abwehr Second Department. Their goal was to run diversion activities after Germany's attack on the Soviet Union. This information is part of the testimony that Abwehr Colonel Erwin Stolze gave on 25 December 1945 and submitted to the Nuremberg trials, with a request to be admitted as evidence.

In the spring of 1941, Bandera held meetings with the heads of Germany's intelligence, regarding the formation of "Nachtigall" and "Roland" Battalions. In the spring of that year, the OUN received 2.5 million marks for subversive activities inside the Soviet Union. Gestapo and Abwehr officials protected Bandera's followers, as both organizations intended to use them for their own purposes.

On June 23, 1941, one day after the German attack on the Soviet Union, Bandera sent a letter to Hitler arguing the case for an independent Ukraine. On 30 June 1941, with the arrival of Nazi troops in Ukraine, Bandera and the OUN-B unilaterally declared an independent Ukrainian state ("Act of Renewal of Ukrainian Statehood"). The proclamation pledged a cooperation of the new Ukrainian state with Nazi Germany under the leadership of Hitler with a closing note "Glory to the heroic German army and its Führer, Adolf Hitler". The declaration was accompanied by violent pogroms.

Bandera's expectation that the Nazi regime would post facto recognize an independent fascist Ukraine as an Axis ally proved to be wrong. The Germans also barred Bandera from moving to newly conquered Lviv, limiting his residency to occupied Cracow. On 5 July, Bandera was placed under house arrest and later, as an honorary inmate in a Berlin prison. On 12 July, the prime minister of the newly formed Ukrainian National Government, Yaroslav Stetsko, was also arrested and taken to Berlin. Although released from custody on 14 July, both were required to stay in Berlin. The Germans closed OUN-B offices in Berlin and Vienna, and on 15 September 1941 Bandera and leading OUN members were arrested by the Gestapo.

All functionaries of the Bandera Movement must be arrested at once and, after thorough interrogation, are to be liquidated". 

In January 1942, Bandera was transferred to Sachsenhausen concentration camp's special prison cell building for high-profile political prisoners such as Horia Sima, the chancellor of Austria, Kurt von Schuschnigg or Stefan Grot-Rowecki and was kept in special, comparatively comfortable detention. In April 1944, Bandera and his deputy Yaroslav Stetsko were approached by a Reich Security Main Office official to discuss plans for diversions and sabotage against the Soviet Army. In September 1944, Bandera was released by the German authorities and allowed to return to Ukraine in the hope that his partisans would unite with OUN-M and harass the Soviet troops, which by that time had handed the Germans major defeats. Germany sought to cooperate with the OUN and other Ukrainian leaders. According to Richard Breitman and Norman Goda in Hitler's Shadow, Bandera and Stetsko refused to do this, and in December 1944 they fled Berlin, heading south.

In February 1945, at a conference of the OUN-B in Vienna, Bandera was made the representative of the leadership of the Foreign Units of the OUN (Zakordonni Chastyny OUN or ZCh OUN). At a February meeting of the OUN in Ukraine, Bandera was re-elected as leader of the whole OUN. It was decided by the leadership that Bandera would not come back to Ukraine, but remain abroad and make propaganda for the cause of the OUN. Roman Shukhevych, another OUN nationalist, resigned as the leader of the OUN, and became the leader of OUN in Ukraine.

Postwar activity

After the war, Bandera and his family moved several times around West Germany, staying close to and in Munich, where Bandera organized the ZCh OUN center. He used false identification documents that helped him to conceal his past relationship with the Nazis. He remained the leader of the OUN-B and worked with several anti-communist organizations, such as the Anti-Bolshevik Bloc of Nations, as well as, according to some sources, with the US and British intelligence agencies.

A September 1945 report by the US Office of Strategic Services said that Bandera had "earned a fierce reputation for conducting a 'reign of terror' during World War II". Bandera was protected by the US-backed Gehlen Organization but he also received help from underground organizations of former Nazis who helped Bandera to cross borders between Allied occupation zones. One faction of Bandera's organization, associated with Mykola Lebed, became more closely associated with the CIA.

According to author Stephen Dorril, Bandera re-formed the OUN-B in Munich in 1946 with the sponsorship of MI6. According to Dorril, the organization had been receiving some support from MI6 since the 1930s. 

In 1946, agents of the US Army intelligence agency Counterintelligence Corps (CIC) and NKVD entered into extradition negotiations based on the intra-Allied cooperation wartime agreement made at the Yalta Conference. The CIC wanted Frederick Wilhelm Kaltenbach, who would turn out to be deceased, and in return the Soviet Union proposed Bandera. Bandera and many Ukrainian nationalists had ended up in the American zone after the war. The Soviet Union regarded all Ukrainians as Soviet citizens and demanded their repatriation under the intra-Alied agreement. The US thought Bandera was too valuable to give up due to his knowledge of the Soviet Union, so the US started blocking his extradition under an operation called "Anyface". From the perspective of the US, the Soviet Union and Poland were issuing extradition attempts of these Ukrainians to prevent the US from getting sources of intelligence, so this became one of the factors in the breakdown of the cooperation agreement. However, the CIC still considered Bandera untrustworthy and were concerned about the impact of his activities on Soviet-American relations, and in mid-1947 conducted an extensive and aggressive search to locate him. It failed, having described their quarry as "extremely dangerous" and "constantly en route, frequently in disguise". Some American intelligence reported that he even was guarded by former SS men.

The Bavarian state government initiated a crackdown on Bandera's organization for crimes such as counterfeiting and kidnapping. Gerhard von Mende, a West German government official, provided protection to Bandera who in turn provided him with political reports, which were relayed to the West German Foreign Office. Bandera reached an agreement with the BND, offering them his service, despite the CIA warning the West Germans against cooperating with him. 

Following the war Bandera also visited Ukrainian communities in Canada, Austria, Italy, Spain, Belgium, UK and Holland.

His views

According to Grzegorz Rossoliński-Liebe "Bandera's worldview was shaped by numerous far-right values and concepts including ultranationalism, fascism, racism, and antisemitism; by fascination with violence; by the belief that only war could establish a Ukrainian state; and by hostility to democracy, communism, and socialism. Like other young Ukrainian nationalists, he combined extremism with religion and used religion to sacralize politics and violence."

Historian John-Paul Himka writes that Bandera remained true to the fascist ideology to the end.

Swedish-American historian Per Anders Rudling said that Bandera and his followers "advocated the selective breeding to create a 'pure' Ukrainian race and that "the OUN shared the fascist attributes of anti-liberalism, anti-conservatism, and anti-communism, an armed party, totalitarianism, antisemitism, and adoption of fascist greetings. Its leaders eagerly emphasized to Hitler and Ribbentrop that they shared the Nazi  and a commitment to a fascist New Europe."

American historian Timothy Snyder has described Bandera as a fascist. Political scientist Andreas Umland characterized Bandera as a "Ukrainian ultranationalist", and also told Deutsche Welle that he was not a "nazi", noting Ukrainian nationalism then was "not a copy of Nazism".

Historian David Marples described Bandera’s views as "not untypical of his generation", but as holding "an extreme political stance that rejected any form of cooperation with the rulers of Ukrainian territories: the Poles and the Soviet authorities". For Bandera, Russia was the chief adversary, but he also lacked tolerance for Poles and Jews. Marples also described Bandera as "neither an orator nor a theoretician" and wrote that he had minimal importance as a thinker. Marples considered Rossolinski-Liebe to place too much importance on Bandera's views, writing that Rossolinski-Liebe struggled to find anything of note written by Bandera, and had assumed he was influenced by OUN publicist Dmytro Dontsov and OUN journals.

Ukrainian historian Andrii Portnov writes that Bandera remained a proponent of authoritarian and violent politics until his death.

Views towards Poles

In late 1942, when Bandera was in a German concentration camp, his organization, the Organization of Ukrainian Nationalists, was involved in a massacre of Poles in Volhynia and, in early 1944, ethnic cleansing also spread to Eastern Galicia. It is estimated that more than 35,000 and up to 60,000 Poles, mostly women and children along with unarmed men, were killed during the spring and summer campaign of 1943 in Volhynia, and up to 133,000 if other regions, such as Eastern Galicia, are included.

Despite the central role played by Bandera's followers in the massacre of Poles in western Ukraine, Bandera himself was interned in a German concentration camp when the concrete decision to massacre the Poles was made and when the Poles were killed. According to Yaroslav Hrytsak, Bandera was not completely aware of events in Ukraine during his internment from the summer of 1941 and had serious differences of opinion with Mykola Lebed, the OUN-B leader who remained in Ukraine and who was one of the chief architects of the massacres of Poles.

Views towards Jews
Bandera held antisemitic views. Speaking about Bandera and his men, political scientist Alexander John Motyl told Tablet that antisemitism was not a core part of Ukrainian nationalism in the way it was for Nazism, and the Soviet Union and Poland were considered to be the primary enemies of the OUN. According to him, the attitude of the Ukrainian nationalists towards Jews depended on political circumstances, and they considered Jews to be a "problem" because they were "implicated, or believed to be implicated" in aiding the Soviets take Ukrainian territory, as well as not being Ukrainian. Norman Goda wrote that "Historian Karel Berkhoff, among others, has shown that Bandera, his deputies, and the Nazis shared a key obsession, namely the notion that the Jews in Ukraine were behind Communism and Stalinist imperialism and must be destroyed."

On 10 August 1940 Bandera wrote a letter to Andriy Melnyk saying that he would accept Melnyk's leadership of the OUN, provided he expelled "traitors" in the leadership. One of these was Mykola Stsibors'kyi, who Bandera accused of an absence of "morality and ethics in family life" due to having married a Jewish woman, and especially, a "suspicious" Russian Jewish woman.

In June 1941, Yaroslav Stetsko sent Bandera a report in which he stated "We are creating a militia which will help to remove the Jews and protect the population."

However, Rossolinski-Liebe and Umland both note that Bandera personally had no part in the murders of Jews; Rossolinksi-Liebe said: "he had found no evidence that Bandera supported or condemned 'ethnic cleansing' or killing Jews and other minorities. It was, however, important that people from OUN and UPA 'identified with him. Similarly, Portnov notes that "Bandera did not participate personally in the underground war conducted by the Ukrainian Insurgent Army (UPA), which included the organized ethnic cleansing of the Polish population of Volhynia in north-western Ukraine and killings of the Jews, but he also never condemned them."

Death

The MGB, and from 1954, the Soviet KGB, multiple times attempted to kidnap or assassinate Bandera. On 15 October 1959, Bandera collapsed outside of Kreittmayrstrasse 7 in Munich and died shortly thereafter.  A medical examination established that the cause of his death was poison by cyanide gas. On 20 October 1959, Bandera was buried in the Waldfriedhof Cemetery in Munich. His wife and three children moved to Toronto, Canada.

Two years after his death, on 17 November 1961, the German judicial bodies announced that Bandera's murderer had been a KGB agent named Bohdan Stashynsky who used a cyanide dust spraying gun to murder Bandera acting on the orders of Soviet KGB head Alexander Shelepin and Soviet premier Nikita Khrushchev. After a detailed investigation against Stashynsky, who by then had defected from the KGB and confessed the killing, a trial took place from 8 to 15 October 1962. Stashynsky was convicted, and on 19 October he was sentenced to eight years in prison.

Stashynsky had earlier assassinated Bandera's associate Lev Rebet by similar means.

Family

Bandera's brothers, Oleksandr and Vasyl, were arrested by the Germans and sent to Auschwitz concentration camp where they were allegedly killed by Polish inmates in 1942.

His father Andriy was arrested by the Soviets in late May 1941 for harboring an OUN member and transferred to Kyiv. On 8 July he was sentenced to death and executed on the 10th. His sisters Oksana and Marta–Maria were arrested by the NKVD in 1941 and sent to a gulag in Siberia. Both were released in 1960 without the right to return to Ukraine. Marta–Maria died in Siberia in 1982, and Oksana returned to Ukraine in 1989 where she died in 2004. Another sister, Volodymyra, was sentenced to a term in Soviet labor camps from 1946 to 1956. She returned to Ukraine in 1956.

Legacy

The glorification and attempts to rehabilitate Stepan Bandera are growing trends in Ukraine. According to The Guardian, "Post-war Soviet history propagated the image of Bandera and the UPA as exclusively fascist collaborators and xenophobes." On the other hand, with the rise of nationalism in Ukraine, his memory there has been elevated.

Attitudes in Ukraine towards Bandera

Bandera continues to be a divisive figure in Ukraine. Although Bandera is venerated in certain parts of western Ukraine, and 33% of Lviv's residents consider themselves to be followers of Bandera, he, along with Joseph Stalin and Mikhail Gorbachev, is considered in surveys of Ukraine as a whole among the three historical figures who produce the most negative attitudes.

A national survey conducted by the Kyiv International Institute of Sociology in Ukraine in 2013 inquired about attitudes towards Bandera. It produced the following results:

A poll conducted in early May 2021 by the Democratic Initiatives Foundation together with the Razumkov Centre's sociological service showed that 32% of citizens consider Stepan Bandera's activity as a historical figure to be positive for Ukraine, as many consider his activity negative; another 21% consider Bandera's activities as positive as they are negative. According to the poll, a positive attitude prevails in the western region of Ukraine (70%); in the central region of the state, 27% of respondents consider his activity positive, 27% consider his activity negative and 27% consider his activity both positive and negative; negative attitude prevails in the southern and eastern regions of Ukraine (54% and 48% of respondents consider his activity negative for Ukraine, respectively).

Following the 2022 Russian invasion of Ukraine, where references to Bandera and "Banderites" featured in Russian propaganda, Bandera's favorability appeared to shoot up rapidly, with 74% of Ukrainians viewing him favorably, according to an April 2022 poll from a Ukrainian research organization. Bandera continued to cause friction with countries such as Poland and Israel.

Historian Vyacheslav Likhachev told Haaretz that for public consciousness in Ukraine the only important thing about Bandera was that he fought for Ukrainian independence, and that other details are not important, especially in the context of events from 2014 onwards, where the struggle for Ukrainian independence became more prominent.

Political scientist Andreas Umland wrote in 2017 that issues of remembrance in Ukraine are complicated by its history of existing between and being terrorized by two totalitarian regimes, where millions of Ukrainians were killed, but some collaborated, and the extensive exploitation and manipulation of this history by an aggressive neighbor, Russia. According to him, public debate on these issues is also "spoiled" by biased narratives about the OUN and especially Bandera perpetuated by the Kremlin or "Western dilettante commentaries" featuring "frequent factual imprecisions and indiscriminate historical accusations". He wrote that these inaccuracies are deconstructed with "relish" by OUN apologists within Ukraine, and this has perpetuated a view within Ukraine that the Western public is not well informed about recent Ukrainian history, and even brainwashed by Soviet and Russian propaganda. However, he wrote, research from well regarded universities over the last decade was showing in greater detail where Ukrainians connected to the OUN did, and did not, take part in the Holocaust.

2014 Russian intervention in Ukraine

During the 2014 Crimean crisis and unrest in Ukraine, pro-Russian Ukrainians, Russians (in Russia), and some Western authors alluded to the bad influence of Bandera on Euromaidan protesters and pro-Ukrainian Unity supporters in justifying their actions. According to The Guardian, "The term 'Banderite' to describe his followers gained a recent new and malign life when Russian media used it to demonise Maidan protesters in Kiev, telling people in Crimea and east Ukraine that gangs of Banderites were coming to carry out ethnic cleansing of Russians." Russian media used this to justify Russia's actions. Putin welcomed the annexation of Crimea by declaring that he "was saving them from the new Ukrainian leaders who are the ideological heirs of Bandera, Hitler's accomplice during World War II." Pro-Russian activists claimed: "Those people in Kyiv are Bandera-following Nazi collaborators." Ukrainians living in Russia complained of being labelled a "Banderite", even when they were from parts of Ukraine where Bandera has no popular support. Groups who idolize Bandera took part in the Euromaidan protests but were a minority element.

2022 Russian invasion of Ukraine 
References to Bandera and "Banderites" in Russian propaganda featured during the 2022 Russian invasion of Ukraine, with Vladimir Putin making references to "Banderites" in his speeches. Russia heavily promoted the theme of "denazification", and used rhetoric that was similar to Soviet era policy of equating the development of Ukrainian national identity with Nazism due to Bandera's collaboration, which has a particular resonance in Russia. The Washington Post reported on Russian soldiers rounding up villagers who were deemed to be "Nazis" or "Banderites". Deutsche Welle reported that media in Ukraine included many eyewitness accounts of Russian soldiers pursuing Bandera supporters, and wrote that "whoever is deemed to be a supporter faces torture or death".

Hero of Ukraine award 

On 22 January 2010, on the Day of Unity of Ukraine, the then-President of Ukraine Viktor Yushchenko awarded to Bandera the title of Hero of Ukraine (posthumously) for "defending national ideas and battling for an independent Ukrainian state". A grandson of Bandera, also named Stepan, accepted the award that day from the Ukrainian President during the state ceremony to commemorate the Day of Unity of Ukraine at the National Opera House of Ukraine.

The European Parliament condemned the award, as did Russia, Poland and Jewish politicians and organizations, such as the Simon Wiesenthal Center. On 25 February 2010, the European Parliament expressed hope the decision would be reconsidered. On 14 May 2010, the Russian Foreign Ministry said: "that the event is so odious that it could no doubt cause a negative reaction in the first place in Ukraine. Already it is known a position on this issue of a number of Ukrainian politicians, who believe that solutions of this kind do not contribute to the consolidation of Ukrainian public opinion". On the other hand, the decree was applauded by Ukrainian nationalists in western Ukraine and by a small portion of Ukrainian Americans.

President Viktor Yanukovych declared the award illegal, since Bandera was never a citizen of Ukraine, a stipulation necessary for getting the award. On 5 March 2010, Yanukovych stated that he would make a decision to repeal the decrees to honor the title of Heroes of Ukraine to Bandera and fellow nationalist Roman Shukhevych before the next Victory Day, although the Hero of Ukraine decrees do not stipulate the possibility that a decree on awarding this title can be annulled. On 2 April 2010, an administrative Donetsk region court ruled the presidential decree awarding the title to be illegal. According to the court's decision, Bandera was not a citizen of the Ukrainian Soviet Socialist Republic (vis-à-vis Ukraine). 

On 5 April 2010, the Constitutional Court of Ukraine refused to start constitutional proceedings on the constitutionality of the President Yushchenko decree the award was based on. A ruling by the court was submitted by the Supreme Council of the Autonomous Republic of Crimea on 20 January 2010. In January 2011, the presidential press service informed that the award was officially annulled. This was done after a cassation appeal filed against the ruling by Donetsk District Administrative Court was rejected by the Higher Administrative Court of Ukraine on 12 January 2011.  Former President Yushchenko called the annulment "a gross error".

In December 2018, the Ukrainian parliament considered a motion to again confer the award on Bandera, but the proposal was rejected in August 2019.

Commemoration

In late 2006, the Lviv city administration announced the future transference of the tombs of Stepan Bandera, Andriy Melnyk, Yevhen Konovalets and other key leaders of OUN/UPA to a new area of Lychakiv Cemetery specifically dedicated to victims of the repressions of the Ukrainian national liberation struggle.

In October 2007, the city of Lviv erected a statue dedicated to Bandera. The appearance of the statue has engendered a far-reaching debate about the role of Stepan Bandera and UPA in Ukrainian history. The two previously erected statues were blown up by unknown perpetrators; the current is guarded by a militia detachment 24/7. On 18 October 2007, the Lviv City Council adopted a resolution establishing the Award of Stepan Bandera in journalism.

On 1 January 2009, his 100th birthday was celebrated in several Ukrainian centres and a postage stamp with his portrait was issued the same day. On 1 January 2014, Bandera's 105th birthday was celebrated by a torchlight procession of 15,000 people in the centre of Kyiv and thousands more rallied near his statue in Lviv. The march was supported by the far-right Svoboda party and some members of the center-right Batkivshchyna.

In 2018, the Ukrainian Parliament voted to include Bandera's 110th birthday, on 1 January 2019, in a list of memorable dates and anniversaries to be celebrated that year. The decision was criticized by the Jewish organization Simon Wiesenthal Center.

There are Stepan Bandera museums in Dubliany, Volia-Zaderevatska, Staryi Uhryniv, and Yahilnytsia. There is a Stepan Bandera Museum of Liberation Struggle in London, part of the OUN Archive, and The Bandera Family Museum in Stryi.

There are also Stepan Bandera streets in Lviv (formerly vulytsia Myru, "Peace street"),  Lutsk (formerly Suvorovska street),  Rivne (formerly Moskovska street), Kolomyia, Ivano-Frankivsk,  Chervonohrad (formerly Nad Buhom street), Berezhany (formerly Cherniakhovskoho street), Drohobych (formerly Sliusarska street),  Stryi,  Kalush, Kovel, Volodymyr-Volynskyi, Horodenka, Dubrovytsia, Kolomyia,  Dolyna, Iziaslav, Skole, Shepetivka, Brovary, and Boryspil, and a Stepan Bandera Avenue in Ternopil (part of the former Lenin Avenue). On 16 January 2017, the Ukrainian Institute of National Remembrance stated that of the 51,493 streets, squares and "other facilities" that had been renamed (since 2015) due to decommunization 34 streets were named after Stepan Bandera. Due to "association with the communist totalitarian regime", the Kyiv City Council on 7 July 2016 voted 87 to 10 in favor of supporting renaming Moscow Avenue to Stepan Bandera Avenue. 
In September 2022 a street that was named after Otto Schmidt in Dnipro was renamed to honor Bandera. (This street had originally been the Gymnasium Street until it was renamed to Otto Schmidt Street by Soviet authorities in 1934.) In December 2022 recently liberated Izium decided  to rename Pushkin Street to Stepana Bandera Street.

After the fall of the Soviet Union, monuments dedicated to Stepan Bandera have been constructed in a number of western Ukrainian cities and villages, including a statue in Lviv. Bandera was also named an honorary citizen of a number of western Ukrainian cities.

In late 2018, the Lviv Oblast Council decided to declare the year of 2019 to be the year of Stepan Bandera, sparking protests by Israel. In 2021, the Ukrainian Institute of National Memory under the authority of the Ukrainian Ministry of Culture, included Bandera, among other Ukrainian nationalist figures, in Virtual Necropolis, a project intended to commemorate historical figures important for Ukraine.

Two feature films have been made about Bandera, Assassination: An October Murder in Munich (1995) and The Undefeated (2000), both directed by Oles Yanchuk, along with a number of documentary films.

See also
 Lviv pogroms (1941)
 Massacres of Poles in Volhynia and Eastern Galicia
 Nachtigall Battalion
 Monuments to Stepan Bandera

Notes

References

Further reading

External links

Article about the assassination of Stepan Bandera The Assassination of Stepan Bandera - ARTICLE Bright Review 
Burial of S.Bandera (October 20, 1959, Munich) on YouTube 

1909 births
1959 deaths
Anti-Polish sentiment
Anti-Romanian sentiment
Anti-Russian sentiment
Antisemitism in Ukraine
Assassinated Ukrainian politicians
Burials at Lychakiv Cemetery
Burials at Munich Waldfriedhof
Deaths by poisonous gas
Extrajudicial killings
Holocaust perpetrators in Poland
Lviv Polytechnic alumni
Members of the Ukrainian Greek Catholic Church
Organization of Ukrainian Nationalists politicians
People from the Kingdom of Galicia and Lodomeria
People from Ivano-Frankivsk Oblast
People killed in KGB operations
People murdered in Germany
Recipients who were revoked of the title of Hero of Ukraine
Sachsenhausen concentration camp survivors
Scouting and Guiding in Ukraine
Ukrainian Austro-Hungarians
Ukrainian anti-communists
Ukrainian collaborators with Nazi Germany
Ukrainian independence activists
Ukrainian Insurgent Army
Ukrainian people murdered abroad
Ukrainian politicians before 1991
Ukrainian refugees
Ukrainian revolutionaries
Ukrainian prisoners sentenced to death
Inmates of Bereza Kartuska Prison
Massacres of Poles in Volhynia
Massacres of Poles in Eastern Galicia
Prisoners sentenced to death by Poland
Deaths by cyanide poisoning
Terrorism in Poland